Javier Vicente Wanchope Watson (born 10 August 1968) is a former Costa Rican football striker, who played most of his career with Deportivo Saprissa. He is the current manager of Panamanian club Atlético Chiriquí.

He was the second famous Wanchope soccer player to emerge in Costa Rica, after his dad Vicente, who played in the 1950s and 1960 with Herediano and Limonense. His younger brother is international soccer forward Paulo Wanchope, and his uncle is current coach and former player Carlos Watson.

Club career
Javier began his career with Herediano, a team where all his soccer playing family members have played. He was transferred to Club Nacional de Football, where he played for 2 years in the Primera Division Uruguaya. He also played for Defensor Sporting. His style of playing was similar to his brother Paulo's, and was projecting himself to a successful international career when a knee injury cut his career short, and almost ended it before it even started. He returned to his country to play with Deportivo Saprissa, where he won two national championships, as well as two CONCACAF Champions Cups. He was an excellent scorer for Saprissa. He later had spells at Carmelita and Guatemalan side Suchitepéquez before finishing his career at Santa Bárbara.

International career
He played with his national team, during two World Cup qualifiers, and was part of the 1985 FIFA U-16 World Championship held in China, the first FIFA World Cup tournament where Costa Rica ever appeared.

Managerial career
After retiring, Wanchope became manager at second division El Roble and assistant manager at Herediano in 2010 alongside Marvin Obando. In summer 2011 he took charge of Turrialba.

Panama
He became coach of the Panama national under-20 football team in April 2012 and in June 2013 took the reins at Panamanian outfit Atlético Chiriquí after "Cholito" Méndez resigned. With Chiriquí he won promotion to Panama's top tier in 2014.

References

External links
 

1968 births
Living people
Association football forwards
Costa Rican footballers
Costa Rica international footballers
Copa Centroamericana-winning players
C.S. Herediano footballers
Club Nacional de Football players
Defensor Sporting players
Deportivo Saprissa players
A.D. Carmelita footballers
C.D. Suchitepéquez players
Costa Rican expatriate footballers
Expatriate footballers in Uruguay
Expatriate footballers in Guatemala
Costa Rican football managers
Expatriate football managers in Panama